"Fire" is a song by Australian electronic music duo Peking Duk featuring uncredited vocals from Melbourne songwriter Sarah Aarons. It was released to radio on 11 May 2018. Sales of "Fire" counted towards the Reprisal EP's chart placement.

At the ARIA Music Awards of 2018, the song received four nominations; Best Group, Dance Release, Song of the Year and Best Video.

Track listing

Charts

Release history

References

2018 singles
2018 songs
Peking Duk songs
Sony Music Australia singles
Songs written by Sam Littlemore
Songs written by Sarah Aarons